RAIT is a Development Block of District Kangra in Himachal Pradesh India.  It has over 50 gram panchayats and is surrounded by Dharamsala, Nagrota Suriyan and Nurpur Block.
Rait is located at Pathankot- Dharamsala- Mandi Highway. The Gagal Airport is just 8 km from Block Headquarters.
Rait has base of Kangra Mahila Sabha an NGO that has pioneered the Pine Needle Weaving Craft in India. It is also base of Hari Krishan Murari, a Pahari poet and Tankari script specialist

Pahari is the main local language used here. There is a society named "Saambh" which take care of official documentation for the folk and other activities of this area.

Geography of Kangra district